Trygve Helgaker (born August 11, 1953, in Porsgrunn, Norway) is professor of chemistry, Department of Chemistry, University of Oslo, Norway.

He is a member of the International Academy of Quantum Molecular Science, 2005.

He has written more than 200 scientific papers, and the book, Molecular Electronic-Structure Theory (Trygve Helgaker, Poul Jørgensen, and Jeppe Olsen, Wiley, Chichester, 2000). He is one of the main authors of the DALTON program.

References
 His International Academy of Quantum Molecular Science page

Living people
1953 births
Norwegian chemists
Theoretical chemists
Members of the International Academy of Quantum Molecular Science
People from Porsgrunn
Royal Norwegian Society of Sciences and Letters